Yoweri Kaguta Museveni Tibuhaburwa (born 15 September 1944) is a Ugandan politician and retired senior military officer who has been the 9th and current President of Uganda since 26 January 1986. Museveni spearheaded rebellions with aid of then current military general Tito Okello and general Bale Travor that toppled Ugandan presidents Milton Obote and Idi Amin before he captured power in 1986.

In the mid-to-late 1990s, Museveni was celebrated by the Western world as part of a new generation of African leaders. However, Museveni's presidency has been marred by involvement in the First Congo War, the Rwandan Civil War, and other African Great Lakes conflicts; the Lord's Resistance Army insurgency in Northern Uganda, which caused a humanitarian emergency; and constitutional amendments, scrapping presidential term limits in 2005, and the presidential age limit in 2017.

Museveni's rule has been described by scholars as competitive authoritarianism, or illiberal democracy. Press has been under the authority of government. None of the Ugandan elections for the last 30 years (since 1986) have been found to be free and transparent. On 16 January 2021, Museveni was re-elected for a sixth term with 58.6% of the vote, despite many videos and reports that show ballot box stuffing, over 400 polling stations with 100% voter turnout, and human rights violations. Museveni has recently insisted on retiring; according to a presidential adviser, Museveni does not want to preside at 82 years of age. Museveni has been endorsed by the vice president as a presidential candidate in 2026. , after 36 years of his authoritarian rule, Uganda is ranked 166th in GDP (nominal) per capita and 167th by Human Development Index.

Early life and education 

Museveni was estimated to be born on 15 September 1944 to parents Mzee Amos Kaguta (1916–2013), a cattle keeper, and Esteri Kokundeka Nganzi (1918–2001), in Rukungiri. He is an ethnic Hima of the kingdom of Mpororo (now part of Ankole).

According to Julius Nyerere, Museveni's father, Amos Kaguta, was a soldier in the King's African Rifles during the Second World War. He was in the 7th battalion. So when Yoweri was born, relatives used to say, "His father was a mu-seven" (meaning “in the seventh”). This is how he obtained the name Museveni.

His family later migrated to Ntungamo, then within the British Protectorate of Uganda. Museveni attended Kyamate Elementary School, Mbarara High School, and Ntare School for his primary and secondary education. He also attended the University of Dar es Salaam in Tanzania for his tertiary education. He studied economics and political science. The university at the time was a hotbed of radical pan-African and Marxist political thought. While at university, he formed the University Students' African Revolutionary Front student activist group and led a student delegation to FRELIMO-held territory in Portuguese Mozambique where they received military training. Studying under the leftist Walter Rodney, among others, Museveni wrote a university thesis on the applicability of Frantz Fanon's ideas on revolutionary violence to post-colonial Africa.

Career

1971–1979: Front for National Salvation and the toppling of Amin 

The exile forces opposed to Amin invaded Uganda from Tanzania in September 1972 and were repelled. In October, Tanzania and Uganda signed the Mogadishu Agreement that denied the rebels the use of Tanzanian soil for aggression against Uganda. Museveni broke away from the mainstream opposition and formed the Front for National Salvation (FRONASA) in 1973. In August of the same year, he married Janet Kainembabazi.

In October 1978 Ugandan troops invaded the Kagera Salient in northern Tanzania, initiating the Uganda–Tanzania War. Tanzanian President Julius Nyerere ordered the Tanzania People's Defence Force (TPDF) to counter-attack and mobilised Ugandan dissidents to fight Amin's regime. Museveni was pleased by this development. In December 1978 Nyerere attached Museveni and his forces to Tanzanian troops under Brigadier Silas Mayunga. Museveni and his FRONASA troops subsequently accompanied the Tanzanians during the counter-invasion of Uganda. He was present during the capture and destruction of Mbarara in February 1979, and involved in the Western Uganda campaign of 1979. In course of these operations, he alternatively spent time at the frontlines and in Tanzania where he discussed the cooperation of various anti-Amin rebel groups as well as the political future of Uganda with Tanzanian politicans and other Ugandan opposition figures such as Obote. He played a significant part in the Moshi Conference which led to the unification of the opposition as the Uganda National Liberation Front (UNLF). Yusuf Lule was appointed as UNLF chairman and the potential President of Uganda after Amin's overthrow. Museveni felt dissatisfied with the results of the conference, believing that he and his followers were not granted enough representation.

1980–1986: Ugandan Bush War

Obote II and the National Resistance Army 
With the overthrow of Amin in 1979 and the contested election that returned Milton Obote to power in 1980, Museveni returned to Uganda with his supporters to gather strength in their rural strongholds in the Bantu-dominated south and south-west to form the Popular Resistance Army (PRA). They then planned a rebellion against the second Obote regime (Obote II) and its armed forces, the Uganda National Liberation Army (UNLA). The insurgency began with an attack on an army installation in the central Mubende district on 6 February 1981. The PRA later merged with former president Yusufu Lule's fighting group, the Uganda Freedom Fighters, to create the National Resistance Army (NRA) with its political wing, the National Resistance Movement (NRM). Two other rebel groups, the Uganda National Rescue Front (UNRF) and the Former Uganda National Army (FUNA), engaged Obote's forces. The FUNA was formed in the West Nile sub-region from the remnants of Amin's supporters.

The NRA/NRM developed a "Ten-point Programme" for an eventual government, covering: democracy; security; consolidation of national unity; defending national independence; building an independent, integrated, and self-sustaining economy; improvement of social services; elimination of corruption and misuse of power; redressing inequality; cooperation with other African countries; and a mixed economy.

The Central Intelligence Agency's World Factbook estimates that the Obote regime was responsible for more 100,000 civilian deaths across Uganda.

1985 Nairobi Agreement 

On 27 July 1985, subfactionalism within the Uganda People's Congress government led to a successful military coup against Obote by his former army commander, Lieutenant-General Tito Okello, an Acholi. Museveni and the NRM/NRA were angry that the revolution for which they had fought for four years had been "hijacked" by the UNLA, which they viewed as having been discredited by gross human rights violations during Obote II.

Despite these reservations, however, the NRM/NRA eventually agreed to peace talks presided over by a Kenyan delegation headed by President Daniel arap Moi. The talks, which lasted from 26 August to 17 December, were notoriously acrimonious and the resultant ceasefire broke down almost immediately. The final agreement, signed in Nairobi, called for a ceasefire, demilitarisation of Kampala, integration of the NRA and government forces, and absorption of the NRA leadership into the Military Council. These conditions were never met.

Battle of Kampala 

While involved in the peace negotiations, Museveni was courting General Mobutu Sésé Seko of Zaire to forestall the involvement of Zairean forces in support of Okello's military junta. On 20 January 1986, however, several hundred troops loyal to Amin were accompanied into Ugandan territory by the Zairean military. The forces intervened following secret training in Zaire and an appeal from Okello ten days previously.

By 22 January, government troops in Kampala had begun to quit their posts en masse as the rebels gained ground from the south and south-west.

Museveni was sworn in as president on 29 January. "This is not a mere change of guard, it is a fundamental change," said Museveni, after a ceremony conducted by British-born Chief Justice Peter Allen. Speaking to crowds of thousands outside the Ugandan parliament, the new president promised a return to democracy: "The people of Africa, the people of Uganda, are entitled to a democratic government. It is not a favour from any regime. The sovereign people must be the public, not the government."

Rise to power: 1986–1996

Political and economic regeneration 
Uganda began participating in an IMF Economic Recovery Program in 1987. Its objectives included the restoration of incentives in order to encourage growth, investment, employment, and exports; the promotion and diversification of trade with particular emphasis on export promotion; the removal of bureaucratic constraints and divestment from ailing public enterprises so as to enhance sustainable economic growth and development through the private sector and the liberalisation of trade at all levels.

Human rights and internal security

The NRM came to power promising to restore security and respect for human rights. Indeed, this was part of the NRM's ten-point programme, as Museveni noted in his swearing in speech:

Although Museveni now headed up a new government in Kampala, the NRM could not project its influence fully across Ugandan territory, finding itself fighting a number of insurgencies. From the beginning of Museveni's presidency, he drew strong support from the Bantu-speaking south and south-west, where Museveni had his base. Museveni managed to get the Karamojong, a group of semi-nomads in the sparsely populated north-east that had never had a significant political voice, to align with him by offering them a stake in the new government. The northern region along the Sudanese border, however, proved more troublesome. In the West Nile sub-region, inhabited by Kakwa and Lugbara (who had previously supported Amin), the UNRF and FUNA rebel groups fought for years until a combination of military offensives and diplomacy pacified the region. The leader of the UNRF, Moses Ali, gave up his struggle to become the second deputy prime minister. People from the northern parts of the country viewed the rise of a government led by a person from the south with great trepidation. Rebel groups sprang up among the Lango, Acholi, and Teso peoples, though they were overwhelmed by the strength of the NRA except in the far north where the Sudanese border provided a safe haven. The Acholi rebel Uganda People's Democratic Army (UPDA) failed to dislodge the NRA occupation of Acholiland, leading to the desperate chiliasm of the Holy Spirit Movement (HSM). The defeat of both the UPDA and HSM left the rebellion to a group that eventually became known as the Lord's Resistance Army, which would turn upon the Acholi themselves.

The NRA subsequently earned a reputation for respecting the rights of civilians, although Museveni later received criticism for using child soldiers. Undisciplined elements within the NRA soon tarnished a hard-won reputation for fairness. "When Museveni's men first came they acted very well – we welcomed them," said one villager, "but then they started to arrest people and kill them."

In March 1989, Amnesty International published a human rights report on Uganda, entitled Uganda, the Human Rights Record 1986–1989. It documented gross human rights violations committed by NRA troops. According to Olara Otunnu, a United Nations Diplomat argued that Museveni pursued a genocide to nilotic – luo people living in the Northern part of the country. In one of the most intense phases of the war, between October and December 1988, the NRA forcibly cleared approximately 100,000 people from their homes in and around Gulu town. Soldiers committed hundreds of extrajudicial executions as they forcibly moved people, burning down homes and granaries. In its conclusion, however, the report offered some hope:

However, on 13 September 2019, Museveni's former Inspector General of Police (IGP) General Kale Kayihura was placed on the United States Department of the Treasury sanctions list for gross violation of Human rights during his reign as the IGP (from 2005 to March 2018). This was due to activities of the Uganda Police's Flying Squad Unit that involved torture and corruption. Kayihura was subsequently replaced with Martin Okoth Ochola.

First elected term (1996–2001)

Elections 
The first elections under Museveni's government were held on 9 May 1996. Museveni defeated Paul Ssemogerere of the Democratic Party, who contested the election as a candidate for the "Inter-party forces coalition", and the upstart candidate Kibirige Mayanja. Museveni won with 75.5 percent of the vote from a turnout of 72.6 percent of eligible voters. Although international and domestic observers described the vote as valid, both the losing candidates rejected the results. Museveni was sworn in as president for the second time on 12 May 1996.

In 1997 he introduced free primary education.

The second set of elections were held in 2001. President Museveni got 69 percent of the vote to beat his rival Kizza Besigye. Besigye had been a close confidant of the president and was his bush war physician. They, however, had a fallout shortly before the 2001 elections, when Besigye decided to stand for the presidency. The 2001 election campaigns were a heated affair with President Museveni threatening to put his rival "six feet under".

The election culminated in a petition filed by Besigye at the Supreme Court of Uganda. The court ruled that the elections were not free and fair but declined to nullify the outcome by a 3–2 majority decision. The court held that although there were many cases of election malpractice, they did not affect the result in a substantial manner. Chief Justice Benjamin Odoki and Justices Alfred Karokora and Joseph Mulenga ruled in favor of the respondents while Justices Aurthur Haggai Oder and John Tsekoko ruled in favor of Besigye.

International recognition 
Museveni was elected chairperson of the Organisation of African Unity (OAU) in 1991 and 1992.

Perhaps Museveni's most widely noted accomplishment has been his government's successful campaign against AIDS. During the 1980s, Uganda had one of the highest rates of HIV infection in the world, but now Uganda's rates are comparatively low, and the country stands as a rare success story in the global battle against the virus (see AIDS in Africa). One of the campaigns headed by Museveni to fight against HIV/AIDS was the ABC program. The ABC program had three main parts "Abstain, Be faithful, or use Condoms if A and B are not practiced." In April 1998, Uganda became the first country to be declared eligible for debt relief under the Heavily Indebted Poor Countries (HIPC) initiative, receiving some US$700 million in aid.

Museveni was lauded by some for his affirmative action program for women in the country. He served with a female vice-president, Specioza Kazibwe, for nearly a decade, and has done much to encourage women to go to college. On the other hand, Museveni has resisted calls for greater women's family land rights (the right of women to own a share of their matrimonial homes).

The New York Times in 1997 said about Museveni:

These are heady days for the former guerilla who runs Uganda. He moves with the measured gait and sure gestures of a leader secure in his power and his vision. It is little wonder. To hear some of the diplomats and African experts tell it, President Yoweri K. Museveni started an ideological movement that is reshaping much of Africa, spelling the end of the corrupt, strong-man governments that characterized the cold-war era. These days, political pundits across the continent are calling Mr. Museveni an African Bismarck. Some people now refer to him as Africa's "other statesman," second only to the venerated South African President Nelson Mandela.

In official briefing papers from Madeleine Albright's December 1997 Africa tour as Secretary of State, Museveni was claimed by the Clinton administration to be a "beacon of hope" who runs a "uni-party democracy", despite Uganda not permitting multiparty politics.

Museveni has been an important ally of the United States in the War on Terror.

Regional conflict 

Following the Rwandan genocide of 1994, the new Rwandan government felt threatened by the presence across the Rwandan border in the Democratic Republic of the Congo (DRC) of former Rwandan soldiers and members of the previous regime. These soldiers were aided by Mobutu Sese Seko, leading Rwanda (with the aid of Museveni) and Laurent Kabila's rebels during the First Congo War to overthrow Mobutu and take power in the DRC.

In August 1998, Rwanda and Uganda invaded the DRC again during the Second Congo War, this time to overthrow Kabila, who was a former ally of Museveni and Kagame. Museveni and a few close military advisers alone made the decision to send the Uganda People's Defence Force (UPDF) into the DRC. A number of highly placed sources indicate that the Ugandan parliament and civilian advisers were not consulted over the matter, as is required by the 1995 constitution. Museveni apparently persuaded an initially reluctant High Command to go along with the venture. "We felt that the Rwandese started the war and it was their duty to go ahead and finish the job, but our President took time and convinced us that we had a stake in what is going on in Congo", one senior officer is reported as saying. The official reasons Uganda gave for the intervention were to stop a "genocide" against the Banyamulenge in the DRC in concert with Rwandan forces, and that Kabila had failed to provide security along the border and was allowing the Allied Democratic Forces (ADF) to attack Uganda from rear bases in the DRC.

Troops from Rwanda and Uganda plundered the country's rich mineral deposits and timber. The United States responded to the invasion by suspending all military aid to Uganda, a disappointment to the Clinton administration, which had hoped to make Uganda the centrepiece of the African Crisis Response Initiative. In 2000, Rwandan and Ugandan troops exchanged fire on three occasions in the DRC city of Kisangani, leading to tensions and a deterioration in relations between Kagame and Museveni. The Ugandan government has also been criticised for aggravating the Ituri conflict, a sub-conflict of the Second Congo War. The Ugandan army officially withdrew from the Congo in 2003 and a contingent of UN peace keepers was deployed. In December 2005, the International Court of Justice ruled that Uganda must pay compensation to the DRC for human rights violations during the Second Congo War.

Second term (2001–2006)

2001 elections 
In 2001, Museveni won the presidential elections by a substantial majority, with his former friend and personal physician Kizza Besigye as the only real challenger. In a populist publicity stunt, a pentagenarian Museveni travelled on a bodaboda motorcycle taxi to submit his nomination form for the election. Bodaboda is a cheap and somewhat dangerous (by western standards) method of transporting passengers around towns and villages in East Africa.

There was much recrimination and bitterness during the 2001 presidential elections campaign, and incidents of violence occurred following the announcement of the win by Museveni. Besigye challenged the election results in the Supreme Court of Uganda. Two of the five judges concluded that there were such illegalities in the elections and that the results should be rejected. The other three judges decided that the illegalities did not affect the result of the election in a substantial manner, but stated that "there was evidence that in a significant number of polling stations there was cheating" and that in some areas of the country, "the principle of free and fair election was compromised."

Political pluralism and constitutional change 

After the elections, political forces allied to Museveni began a campaign to loosen constitutional limits on the presidential term, allowing him to stand for election again in 2006. The 1995 Ugandan constitution provided for a two-term limit on the tenure of the president.

Moves to alter the constitution and alleged attempts to suppress opposition political forces have attracted criticism from domestic commentators, the international community, and Uganda's aid donors. In a press release, the main opposition party, the Forum for Democratic Change (FDC), accused Museveni of engaging in a "life presidency project", and for bribing members of parliament to vote against constitutional amendments, FDC leaders claimed:

The country is polarized with many Ugandans objecting to [the constitutional amendments]. If Parliament goes ahead and removes term limits, this may cause serious unrest, political strife and may lead to turmoil both through the transition period and thereafter ... We would therefore like to appeal to President Museveni to respect himself, the people who elected him, and the Constitution under which he was voted President in 2001 when he promised the country and the world at large to hand over power peacefully and in an orderly manner at the end of his second and last term. Otherwise, his insistence to stand again will expose him as a consummate liar and the biggest political fraudster this country has ever known.

As observed by some political commentators, including Wafula Oguttu, Museveni had previously stated that he considered the idea of clinging to office for "15 or more" years ill-advised. Comments by the Irish anti-poverty campaigner Bob Geldof sparked a protest by Museveni supporters outside the British High Commission in Kampala. "Get a grip Museveni. Your time is up, go away," said the former rock star in March 2005, explaining that moves to change the constitution were compromising Museveni's record against fighting poverty and HIV/AIDS. In an opinion article in the Boston Globe and in a speech delivered at the Wilson Center, former U.S. Ambassador to Uganda Johnnie Carson heaped more criticism on Museveni. Despite recognising the president as a "genuine reformer" whose "leadership [has] led to stability and growth", Carson also said, "we may be looking at another Mugabe and Zimbabwe in the making". "Many observers see Museveni's efforts to amend the constitution as a re-run of a common problem that afflicts many African leaders – an unwillingness to follow constitutional norms and give up power".

In July 2005, Norway became the third European country in as many months to announce symbolic cutbacks in foreign aid to Uganda in response to political leadership in the country. The UK and Ireland made similar moves in May. "Our foreign ministry wanted to highlight two issues: the changing of the constitution to lift term limits, and problems with opening the political space, human rights and corruption", said Norwegian Ambassador Tore Gjos. Of particular significance was the arrest of two opposition MPs from the FDC. Human rights campaigners charged that the arrests were politically motivated. Human Rights Watch stated that "the arrest of these opposition MPs smacks of political opportunism". A confidential World Bank report leaked in May suggested that the international lender might cut its support to non-humanitarian programmes in Uganda. "We regret that we cannot be more positive about the present political situation in Uganda, especially given the country's admirable record through the late 1990s", said the paper. "The Government has largely failed to integrate the country's diverse peoples into a single political process that is viable over the long term...Perhaps most significant, the political trend-lines, as a result of the President's apparent determination to press for a third term, point downward."

Museveni responded to the mounting international pressure by accusing donors of interfering with domestic politics and using aid to manipulate poor countries. "Let the partners give advice and leave it to the country to decide ... [developed] countries must get out of the habit of trying to use aid to dictate the management of our countries." "The problem with those people is not the third term or fighting corruption or multipartism," added Museveni at a meeting with other African leaders, "the problem is that they want to keep us there without growing.".

In July 2005, a constitutional referendum lifted a 19-year restriction on the activities of political parties. In the non-party "Movement system" (so-called "the movement") instituted by Museveni in 1986, parties continued to exist, but candidates were required to stand for election as individuals rather than representative of any political grouping. This measure was ostensibly designed to reduce ethnic divisions, although many observers have subsequently claimed that the system had become nothing more than a restriction on opposition activity. Before the vote, the FDC spokesperson stated, "Key sectors of the economy are headed by people from the president's home area.... We have got the most sectarian regime in the history of the country in spite of the fact that there are no parties." Many Ugandans saw Museveni's conversion to political pluralism as a concession to donors – aimed at softening the blow when he announces he wants to stay on for a third term. Opposition MP Omara Atubo has said Museveni's desire for change was merely "a facade behind which he is trying to hide ambitions to rule for life".

Death of John Garang 
On 30 July 2005, Sudanese vice-president John Garang was killed when the Ugandan presidential helicopter crashed while he was flying back to Sudan from talks in Uganda. Garang had been Sudan's vice-president for only three weeks before his death.

Widespread speculation as to the cause of the crash led Museveni, on 10 August, to threaten the closure of media outlets that published "conspiracy theories" about Garang's death. In a statement, Museveni claimed that the speculation was a threat to national security. "I will no longer tolerate a newspaper which is like a vulture. Any newspaper that plays around with regional security, I will not tolerate it – I will close it." The following day, popular radio station KFM had its license withdrawn for broadcasting a debate on Garang's death. Radio presenter Andrew Mwenda was eventually arrested for sedition in connection with comments made on his KFM talk show.

February 2006 elections 

On 17 November 2005, Museveni was chosen as NRMs presidential candidate for the February 2006 elections. His candidacy for a further third term sparked criticism, as he had promised in 2001 that he was contesting for the last time.

The arrest of the main opposition leader Kizza Besigye on 14 November – charged with treason, concealment of treason, and rape – sparked demonstrations and riots in Kampala and other towns. Museveni's bid for a third term, the arrest of Besigye, and the besiegement of the High Court during a hearing of Besigye's case (by a heavily armed Military Intelligence group dubbed by the press as the "Black Mambas Urban Hit Squad"), led Sweden, the Netherlands, and the United Kingdom to withhold economic support to Museveni's government because of their concerns about the country's democratic development. On 2 January 2006, Besigye was released after the High Court ordered his immediate release.

The 23 February 2006 elections were Uganda's first multi-party elections in 25 years and were seen as a test of its democratic credentials. Although Museveni did worse than in the previous election, he was elected for another five-year tenure, having won 59 percent of the vote against Besigye's 37 percent. Besigye alleged fraud and rejected the result. The European Union and independent Ugandan electoral observers described the 2006 elections as not a fair and free contest. The Supreme Court of Uganda later ruled that the election was marred by intimidation, violence, voter disenfranchisement, and other irregularities; however, the court voted 4–3 to uphold the results of the election.

Third term (2006–2011) 

In 2007, Museveni deployed troops to the African Union's peacekeeping operation in Somalia.

Also in this term, Museveni held meetings with investors that included Wisdek, to promote Uganda's call centre and outsourcing industry and create employment to the country.

September 2009 riots 
In September 2009 Museveni refused Kabaka Muwenda Mutebi, the Buganda King, permission to visit some areas of the Buganda Kingdom, particularly the Kayunga district. Riots occurred and over 40 people were killed while others remain imprisoned to this date. Furthermore, nine more people were killed during the April 2011 "Walk to Work" demonstrations. According to the Human Rights Watch 2013 World Report on Uganda, the government has failed to investigate the killings associated with both of these events.

Fundamentalist Christianity 
In 2009, MSNBC and NPR reported on Jeff Sharlet's investigation regarding ties between Museveni and the American fundamentalist Christian organization The Fellowship (also known as "The Family"). Sharlet reports that Douglas Coe, leader of The Fellowship, identified Museveni as the organization's "key man in Africa."

LGBT rights 
Further international scrutiny accompanied the 2009 Ugandan efforts to institute the death penalty for homosexuality, with British, Canadian, French, and American leaders expressing concerns for human rights. British newspaper The Guardian reported that Museveni "appeared to add his backing" to the legislative effort by, among other things, claiming "European homosexuals are recruiting in Africa", and saying gay relationships were against God's will.

Museveni and members of NRM continue to use the terms 'gay' and 'homosexuals' to degrade opponents and in particular members of the National Unity Platform.

Fourth term (2011–2016) 

Museveni was re-elected on 20 February 2011 with a 68 percent majority with 59 percent of registered voters having voted. The election results were disputed by both the European Union and the opposition. "The electoral process was marred with avoidable administrative and logistical failures", according to the European Union election observer team.

Following the fall of Egypt's Hosni Mubarak and Libya's Muammar Gaddafi, Museveni became the fifth-longest serving African leader.

In October 2011, the annual inflation rate reached 30.5 percent, principally due to food and fuel increases. Earlier in 2011, opposition leader Kizza Besigye staged "Walk to Work" protests against the high cost of living. On 28 April 2011, Besigye was arrested because Museveni said Besigye had attacked first, a charge he denied. Besigye's arrest led to more riots in Kampala. Besigye promised that "peaceful demonstrations" would continue. The government's response to the riots has been condemned by donor nations. In more recent years, infringements on press freedom have increasingly been a central focus. According to Human Rights Watch, "Between January and June [2013], a media watchdog organization registered 50 attacks on journalists, despite multiple pledges to respect media freedom." During this period, two widely read periodicals, The Daily Monitor and The Red Pepper, were shut down and seized by the government because they published allegations about a "plot to assassinate senior government and military officials who [were] opposed to Ugandan President Yoweri Museveni ... and his plans to hand over power to his son when he retires".

Another issue of human rights became an issue in early 2014 when Museveni signed an anti-homosexuality bill into law. In an interview with CNN, Museveni called homosexuals "disgusting" and said that homosexuality was a learned trait. Western leaders, including United States President Obama, condemned the law.

Museveni has criticised the US's involvement in the Libyan Civil War, and in a UN speech argued that military intervention from African countries produces more stable countries in the long term, which he calls "African solutions for African problems."

Fifth term (2016–2021)

2016 election 

The presidential candidates included incumbent Yoweri Museveni, in power since 1986, and Kizza Besigye, who complained of rigging and violence at polling stations. Voting was extended in several locations after reports of people not being allowed to cast their votes. According to the Electoral Commission, Museveni was re-elected (18 February 2016) with 61 percent of the vote to Besigye's 35 percent. Opposition candidates claimed that the elections were marred by widespread fraud, voting irregularities, the repeated arrest of opposition politicians, and a climate of voter intimidation.

2018 age limit bill 

President Yoweri Museveni, as the incumbent president of Uganda, signed the Constitutional Amendment Bill No. 2 2017, commonly known as the "Age Limit" bill on 27 December 2017. The bill was successfully passed by the 10th parliament of Uganda on 20 December 2017. As of 27 December 2017, in accordance with articles 259 and 262 of the Constitution of Uganda, the bill has effectively amended the Constitution to remove the presidential age limit caps. Before the amendment, article 102 (b) barred people above 75 and those below 35 years from running for the highest office. The current age limit bill also extends the term of office of parliament from the current five years to seven years. The bill also restores presidential two-term limits which had been removed in a 2005 constitutional amendment.

Challenge to the bill 
After Museveni signed the 2018 Age Limit Bill into law on 27 December 2017 (but parliament received the letter on 2 January 2018), the general public protested as they had been doing prior to the signing of the bill, using all avenues including on social media. In October 2017, some MPs returned what they alleged were bribes to facilitate the bill.

The Uganda Law Society and members of the opposition house sued and challenged the bill in court, citing that the process leading to the vote was in violation of Articles 1, 2, 8A, 44 (c), 79 and 94 of the Ugandan constitution because the Speaker of Parliament [Kadaga] closed debate on the Amendment after only 124 out of 451 legislators had debated the bill. They also argue that the use of force by the army and police during the bill debate was inconsistent with and in contravention of Articles 208(2), 209 and 259 among others. The third argument they make is that the bill violates other constitutional clauses in relation to the extension of terms and electoral procedures. One legislature [Mbwaketamwa Gaffa] is quoted as saying, “…when the president ascents [sic] to the bill, it might be legal, but it will be illegitimate, and we are going to challenge it.”

Public reaction to the new bill 

The law enforcement agencies in Uganda, i.e. the police, the military etc., have arrested at least 53 people, including opposition leader Kizza Besigye for demonstrating against the bill to scrap the presidential age limit.

A group of legislators from the ruling party, the National Resistance Movement (NRM), clandestinely agitated to remove the age limit because it would give the incumbent president Yoweri Museveni a leeway to run for another term in the elections that would take place in 2021.

A three-month survey conducted between September and November by civil society organizations recorded that 85 percent of the sampled population opposed to the removal of the age limit, with only 15 percent in support of the bill.

Ugandan lawmakers have voted overwhelmingly to remove the presidential age limits because they want to pave way for the current president Yoweri Museveni to serve a sixth term in office. Human rights lawyer Nicholas Opiyo said that removing the age limitone of the most important safeguardswill entrench a dictatorial and autocratic regime in Uganda.

Sixth term (2021–)
On 16 January 2021 the electoral commission of Uganda announced that Museveni won re-election for a sixth term with 58.6% of the vote. Runner-up Robert Kyagulanyi Ssentamu, known professionally as Bobi Wine, and other opposition leaders refused to accept the results, claiming that the election was the most fraudulent in Uganda's history. During the campaign for the presidential elections on 19 November 2020, Museveni described Wine's campaign as being financed by foreigners, and, in particular, foreign homosexuals. Independent organisations and democracy experts confirmed the elections were neither free or fair. The Electoral Commission published a Declaration of Results form that turned out to be fraudulent. The Electoral Commission promised an investigation which did not take place. Wine was placed under house arrest on 15 January. Independent international observers called for investigation into potential election fraud amidst a nationwide internet shutdown, human rights abuses, and denied accreditation requests. Wine was released on 26 January.

In June 2021, 44 people were arrested at an LGBT center, with the pretext of violating Covid SOPs.

In October 2022 Museveni apologized to Kenya on behalf of his son, Muhoozi Kainerugaba who tweeted that he could invade Kenya in two weeks.

Personal life 
Museveni is an Anglican and a member of the Church of Uganda.

He is married to Janet Kataaha Museveni, née Kainembabazi, with whom he has four children:
 Gen. Muhoozi Kainerugaba – Born in 1974, General in the Uganda People's Defence Forces (UPDF)  in the UPDF
 Natasha Karugire – Born in 1976, Fashion designer and consultant. Married to Edwin Karugire. Private Secretary to the President of Uganda for Household Affairs.
 Patience Rwabwogo – Born in 1978, pastor of Covenant Nations Church, Buziga, Kampala. – Married to Odrek Rwabwogo.
 Diana Kamuntu – Born in 1980, Married to Geoffrey Kamuntu.

Honours and awards

Foreign honours
 
  Chief of the Order of the Golden Heart of Kenya
 
  Order of the Republic of Serbia, Second Class
 
  Grand Cross of the Order of Good Hope

Honorary degrees

See also 

 Political parties of Uganda
 Politics of Uganda
 Tokyo International Conference on African Development
 History of Uganda (1979–present)
 Uganda Salvation Front
 Henry Tumukunde

References

Works cited

Further reading

Books 

 Museveni, Yoweri (1997). Sowing the Mustard Seed: The Struggle for Freedom and Democracy in Uganda, Macmillan Education. .
 Museveni, Yoweri (2000). What Is Africa's Problem?. University of Minnesota Press. 
 Ondoga Ori Amaza. Museveni's Long March from Guerrilla to Statesman, Fountain Publishers. 
 Tripp, Aili Mari. Museveni's Uganda: Paradoxes of Power in a Hybrid Regime. Lynne Rienner Publishers. 
 Epstein, Helen C. (2017). Another Fine Mess: America, Uganda and the War on Terror, New York: Columbia Global Reports.

Academic papers 

 "Uganda, 1979–85: Leadership in Transition", Jimmy K. Tindigarukayo, The Journal of Modern African Studies, Vol. 26, No. 4. (December 1988), pp. 607–622. (JSTOR)
 "Neutralising the Use of Force in Uganda: The Role of the Military in Politics", E. A. Brett, The Journal of Modern African Studies, Vol. 33, No. 1. (March 1995), pp. 129–152. (JSTOR)
 "Called to Account: How African Governments Investigate Human Rights Violations", Richard Carver, African Affairs, Vol. 89, No. 356. (July 1990), pp. 391–415. (JSTOR)
 "Uganda after Amin: The Continuing Search for Leadership and Control", Cherry Gertzel, African Affairs, Vol. 79, No. 317. (October 1980), pp. 461–489. (JSTOR)
 "Social Disorganisation in Uganda: Before, during, and after Amin", Aidan Southall, The Journal of Modern African Studies, Vol. 18, No. 4. (December 1980), pp. 627–656. (JSTOR)
 "Ugandan Relations with Western Donors in the 1990s: What Impact on Democratisation?", Ellen Hauser, The Journal of Modern African Studies, Vol. 37, No. 4. (December 1999), pp. 621–641. (JSTOR)
 "Reading Museveni: Structure, Agency and Pedagogy in Ugandan Politics", Ronald Kassimir, Canadian Journal of African Studies, Vol. 33, No. 2/3, Special Issue: "French-Speaking Central Africa: Political Dynamics of Identities and Representations". (1999), pp. 649–673. (JSTOR)
 "Uganda: The Making of a Constitution", Charles Cullimore, The Journal of Modern African Studies, Vol. 32, No. 4. (December 1994), pp. 707–711. (JSTOR)
 "Uganda's Domestic and Regional Security since the 1970s", Gilbert M. Khadiagala, The Journal of Modern African Studies, Vol. 31, No. 2. (June 1993), pp. 231–255. (JSTOR)
 "Exile, Reform, and the Rise of the Rwandan Patriotic Front", Wm. Cyrus Reed, The Journal of Modern African Studies, Vol. 34, No. 3. (September 1996), pp. 479–501. (JSTOR)
 "Operationalising Pro-Poor Growth", A Country Case Study on Uganda, John A. Okidi, Sarah Ssewanyana, Lawrence Bategeka, Fred Muhumuza, October 2004
 "'New-Breed' Leadership, Conflict, and Reconstruction in the Great Lakes Region of Africa: A Sociopolitical Biography of Uganda's Yoweri Kaguta Museveni", Joseph Oloka-Onyango, Africa Today – Volume 50, Number 3, Spring 2004, pp. 29–52 (Project MUSE)
 "No-Party Democracy" in Uganda, Nelson Kasfir, Journal of Democracy – Volume 9, Number 2, April 1998, pp. 49–63 (Project MUSE)
 "Explaining Ugandan intervention in Congo: evidence and interpretations", John F. Clark, The Journal of Modern African Studies, 39: 261–287, 2001 (Cambridge Journals)
 "Uganda's 'Benevolent' Dictatorship", J. Oloka-Onyango, University of Dayton website
 , James Katorobo, No. 17, Les Cahiers d'Afrique de l'est
 "Hostile to Democracy: The Movement System and Political Repression in Uganda" Peter Bouckaert, Human Rights Watch, 1 October 1999
 "Uganda: From one party to multi-party and beyond", Ronald Elly Wanda, The Norwegian Council for Africa, October 2005.
 "Protracted conflict, elusive peace – Initiatives to end the violence in northern Uganda", editor Okello Lucima, Accord issue 11, Conciliation Resources, 2002
 "Profiles of the parties to the conflict", Balam Nyeko and Okello Lucima
 "Reaching the 1985 Nairobi Agreement", Bethuel Kiplagat

External links 
 
 
 
 State House Official Website 

|-

 
1944 births
Commonwealth Chairpersons-in-Office
Living people
National Resistance Movement politicians
People from Ntungamo District
Presidents of Uganda
Speakers of the Parliament of Uganda
Ugandan evangelicals
Ugandan military personnel
Ugandan exiles
Ugandan rebels
Ugandan writers
University of Dar es Salaam alumni
Military personnel of the Uganda–Tanzania War
Ugandan generals
People educated at Ntare School
People educated at Mbarara High School
Leaders who took power by coup
Leaders of political parties in Uganda
21st-century Ugandan politicians